The RB-04 (Robot 04) is a long-range sea skimming fire-and-forget air-to-surface, anti-ship missile. The missile was known as the "RB-304" during development and early service years.

Development 
While interest in guided anti-ship missiles was subdued in the 1950s, it was not entirely extinct. In 1949, the Swedish government placed a request for a radar-guided, air-launched anti-ship missile. The request materialized as the SAAB "Robot-Byrån (RB) 04", which was first test launched by a Saab 29 Tunnan fighter in early 1955.
The early versions of the missile suffered teething problems in regards to the two targeting modes, which were area attack, for striking a big group of ships (like an invasion fleet), and select targeting, where the missiles home in on a single vessel. In the area attack the missile would only target a ship in the group if they were within 1,000 meters of another vessel, this was also in the early electronic age, and changes in this distance required hardware modifications in a workshop.

Many components of the missile were reused when the RBS-15 was developed, including the main body and warhead, although the motor and main wings were the most obvious external changes.

Variants 
RB-04C: The initial production version, the "RB-04C", entered service with Swedish Air Force A 32A Lansen attack aircraft in 1959. The RB-04C had a canard configuration, with short triangular cruciform fins around the nose, and two wide wings with fins attached to the wingtips. The RB-04C had a boost-sustain solid rocket motor and a SAP warhead that could be fitted with a contact or proximity fuse.
RB-04D: Further development of the C version. Longer range rocket engines and maintenance free thermal batteries where the main improvements. Introduced in the late 1960s.
RB-04E: Further development of the D version to suit the new AJ37 Viggen strike aircraft. The missile had a shorter wingspan and improved guidance system and new monopulse radar seeker. This version was highly resistant to ECM and would automatically lock on especially powerful jamming signals.

Operational use 

The missile has never seen combat; the closest it has come to being used was during the "Whiskey on the Rocks" incident in 1981, when a Soviet (NATO code Whiskey Class) submarine ran aground outside the naval station in Karlskrona. Swedish AJ37 Viggens with RB-04E's mounted under their wings, taken from top secret storage bunkers, stood on high alert for a possible Soviet incursion.
On one occasion, when a Soviet rescue operation seemed to be underway, aircraft were scrambled with the intent to intercept Soviet ships.

References

Svenskt Militärflyg - Bo Widfeldt / Åke Hall (2005)
An Illustrated Guide To Modern Airborne Missiles - Bill Gunston, Arco Publishing, Inc. (1983)

External links
 "Swedish Air Force Has Rocket Powered Missiles" Popular Mechanics, April 1958, p. 112 - note that photo caption is wrong in stating that it is an air-to-air missile.

Anti-ship missiles of Sweden
Anti-ship missiles of the Cold War
Weapons of Sweden